The Matthews-Storey House is a historic house at 8115 Ascension Road in southern Little Rock, Arkansas.  It is a mostly single-story Craftsman Airplane-style structure, in which a small second story at the center makes the building resemble an early aircraft.  The building features a carport to the right and a projecting porch to the front, each with supporting stone pillars and exposed rafters underneath.  The house was built in 1925 by the Justin Matthews Company, a major developer in the city at that time.

The house was listed on the National Register of Historic Places in 2015.

See also
National Register of Historic Places listings in Little Rock, Arkansas

References

Houses on the National Register of Historic Places in Arkansas
Houses completed in 1925
Houses in Little Rock, Arkansas
National Register of Historic Places in Little Rock, Arkansas